Aurora Borealis is an album by Cloud Cult.

Track listing
All songs written by Craig Minowa.
"Breakfast With My Shadow" (download) – 2:17
"Alone at a Party in a Ghost Town" – 2:23
"The Princess Bride" – 3:46 - Appears to be removed on Spotify, Apple Music, and Tidal. Citations as to why would be appreciated 
"As Long as You're Happy" – 3:08
"Chandeliers" – 3:51
"Buried Poetry" – 1:47
"All Together Alone" – 3:52
"My Fictitious Life with Amily" – 3:39
"Grappling Hook/Northern Lights" – 6:38
"Lights Inside My Head" – 3:22
"The Sparks and Spaces Between Your Cells" – 3:44
"Beautiful Boy" – 4:10
 Live performance on KUOM from September 26, 2003
"I Guess This Dream Is for Me" – 3:56
"State of the Union" – 3:11
 Samples a State of the Union address by George W. Bush attributed as coming from CampChaos.com

References

External links
Aurora Borealis page at CloudCult.com
Listen to entire album: dialup or broadband

2004 albums
Cloud Cult albums